The Conservative-Monarchist Club (Polish: Klub Zachowawczo-Monarchistyczny, abbr. KZ-M) is a Polish organization of traditionalist, counter-revolutionary, and Catholic character. It was founded on 7 March 1988 as a society. The doctrine of the club can be characterised as integralist conservatism. It is a metapolitical organisation, keeping apart from daily politics, instead, it aims at advancing ideas of free market and Catholic traditionalism. It considers itself a successor to the Conservative-Monarchist Club founded in Kraków, 1926, which in turn succeeded the Conservative Party founded in 1922. The club publishes a quarterly entitled Pro Fide Rege et Lege and maintains the internet portal konserwatyzm.pl.

Notable members

 Marek Jurek 
 Jan Filip Libicki 
 Marcin Libicki 
 Adam Wielomski
 Janusz Korwin-Mikke

See also
Union of Real Politics
Camp of Great Poland (association)

References

Integralism
Politics of Poland
Monarchist organizations
Political organisations based in Poland
1988 establishments in Poland
Organizations established in 1988
Monarchism in Poland
Far-right politics in Poland
Conservatism in Poland